Héraðsvötn is a river in Iceland. It is formed by the confluence of Austari-Jökulsá and Vestari-Jökulsá.

External links 
Photo of the old bridge over Héraðsvötn

Rivers of Iceland